John Alexander Cowdell  (born 24 May 1953) is a former Australian politician.

Born in Perth, Cowdell holds a Bachelor of Arts and a Diploma of Education. He worked as a public servant and adviser to Kim Beazley before being appointed Assistant Secretary of the Western Australian Labor Party; he was also Dean of Kingswood College at the University of Western Australia. In 1993 he was elected to the Western Australian Legislative Council for South West. From 1997 to 2001 he was Shadow Minister for Parliamentary and Electoral Affairs as well as Deputy President of the Council; in 2001 he became President. Cowdell retired from politics in 2005.

Awards and recognition

Cowdell was awarded a Centenary Medal in 2001.
He was appointed a Member of the Order of Australia (AM) in the 2010 Australia Day Honours "For service to the Parliament of Western Australia, to regional development, and to the community, particularly through contributions to history and heritage".

References

1953 births
Living people
Members of the Western Australian Legislative Council
Australian Labor Party members of the Parliament of Western Australia
21st-century Australian politicians
Members of the Order of Australia